Kukurantumi: Road to Accra  was produced in 1983. It is said to be one of the first Ghanaian films to be aired on many European countries' television.

It was directed by King Ampaw.

Cast 
List of characters.

 Sebastian Agbanyoh
 Dorothy Ankomah as Mary
 Charles Ansong as Ofori
 Amy Appiah as Abena
 Samuel Kofi Bryan
 David Dontoh as Bob
 Kwesi France as Alhaji
 Rose Fynn as Seewaa
 Evans Oma Hunter as Addey
 Donkoh Kobina Joseph
 Felix Larbi as Boafi
 Emmi L. Lawson as Old Man
 Samuel Nyanyo Nmai
 Victor Nyaconor
 Kwame A. Prempeh

References

External links 

 https://www.businessghana.com/site/news/entertainment/154203/Kukurantumi-goes-to-London
https://www.trigon-film.org/en/movies/Kukurantumi

Ghanaian comedy-drama films
1983 films
1983 comedy-drama films